Diamond is an unincorporated community in Kanawha County, West Virginia, United States. The community is served by U.S. Route 60.

References

Unincorporated communities in Kanawha County, West Virginia
Unincorporated communities in West Virginia
Populated places on the Kanawha River